The Grote Waard or Hollandse Waard was a farming region in the County of Holland at the border of the Duchy of Brabant, that disappeared in the St. Elizabeth's flood. Parts of this polder are now separated by water: Hoekse Waard, Eiland van Dordrecht, De Biesbosch, and parts of North Brabant. The Grote Waard was a damp peat region, which was roughly limited by what now is the Afgedamde Maas between Heusden and Woudrichem, the Boven Merwede and Beneden Merwede, Dordrecht, Maasdam, the Keizersdijk between Maasdam and Strijen, Strijensas, Lage Zwaluwe, and Hooge Zwaluwe.

See also 
 Drowned villages in the Grote Hollandse Waard alias Zuid-Hollandse Waard

References

Floods in the Netherlands
15th century in the Netherlands
Rhine–Meuse–Scheldt delta
History of North Brabant
History of South Holland